Veeweyde (French, old Dutch spelling) or Veeweide (modern Dutch) is a Brussels Metro station on the western branch of line 5. It is located in the municipality of Anderlecht, in the western part of Brussels, Belgium. It takes its name from the nearby /. 

The station opened on 5 July 1985 and was the western terminus of former line 1B, until the opening of an extension to Bizet in 1992 (further extended in 2003 to Erasme/Erasmus). Following the reorganisation of the Brussels Metro on 4 April 2009, it is served by line 5.

External links

Brussels metro stations
Railway stations opened in 1985
Anderlecht
1985 establishments in Belgium